João Henrique da Silva (born 13 January 1987 in São José do Rio Preto), known as João Henrique, is Brazilian footballer who plays for CRAC as a forward.

He spent the majority of his career representing clubs in the São Paulo state, and had his first experience abroad with Albanian club Flamurtari Vlorë. João Henrique played for ABC Futebol Clube in Campeonato Brasileiro Série B.

References

External links

1987 births
Living people
People from São José do Rio Preto
Brazilian footballers
Association football forwards
Campeonato Brasileiro Série B players
Campeonato Brasileiro Série C players
Campeonato Brasileiro Série D players
América Futebol Clube (SP) players
Marília Atlético Clube players
Clube Atlético Linense players
Esporte Clube Juventude players
Paulista Futebol Clube players
Comercial Futebol Clube (Ribeirão Preto) players
ABC Futebol Clube players
Clube de Regatas Brasil players
Guarani FC players
Associação Portuguesa de Desportos players
Kategoria Superiore players
Flamurtari Vlorë players
Brazilian expatriate footballers
Brazilian expatriate sportspeople in Albania
Expatriate footballers in Albania
Batatais Futebol Clube players
Clube Recreativo e Atlético Catalano players
Footballers from São Paulo (state)